Konrad Geßner (born 25 December 1995 in Erfurt) is a German former professional cyclist, who rode professionally between 2017 and 2019 for the  and  teams.

Major results
2016
 1st Eschborn-Frankfurt City Loop U23
 2nd Road race, National Under-23 Road Championships
 6th Road race, National Road Championships
2017
 2nd Memorial Grundmanna I Wizowskiego
 7th Umag Trophy
 10th Kampioenschap van Vlaanderen

References

External links

1995 births
Living people
German male cyclists
Sportspeople from Erfurt
Cyclists from Thuringia
21st-century German people